Prisovo is a village in the Veliko Tarnovo province of northern Bulgaria.

Geography
Prisovo is located in the central Danubian Plain, near the Balkan Mountains (Stara Planina). The village is located between Prisovo bardo, Debelets bardo and other hills.

History

Education
School Hristo Botev
The first school in the village were established in 1897.

Culture

Communication center Vasil Levski

Prisovo monastery "St. Archangel Michael"
Standing Monastery "ST. Panteleymon"

References
ЦОНЬО СТ.МАРИНОВ И ПЕТКО Д.ПЕТКОВ "СЕЛО КРАЙ ТЪРНОВГРАД"

Villages in Veliko Tarnovo Province